Solano is an unincorporated community in Harding County, New Mexico, United States, founded in 1907. It lies along NM 39 and the tracks of a spur of the Southern Pacific Railroad about half-way between Roy and Mosquero. The post office was opened in 1907.

History
Solano began in 1907 when F. M. Hughes built his house and a store.  It was named after a local mail carrier, Cipriano Solano. Solano was the largest town in Harding County for a time, and even published a local newspaper, The Solano Herald, but when the coal mines in Dawson shut down in the 1950s, its importance waned.

References

Unincorporated communities in New Mexico
Unincorporated communities in Harding County, New Mexico